Francisco Javier Etxarri Marín (born 16 August 1986 in Lekunberri) is a former Spanish racing cyclist.

References

1986 births
Living people
Spanish male cyclists
People from Norte de Aralar
Cyclists from Navarre